Otto Louis Kneidinger Jr. (May 17, 1933 – May 22, 2001) was an American football player and coach. He served as the head football coach at West Chester University of Pennsylvania from 1979 to 1983, compiling a record of 30–21–1. Following his collegiate career at Pennsylvania State University, he was selected by the San Francisco 49ers in the 1955 NFL Draft.

References

1933 births
2001 deaths
American football tackles
Penn State Nittany Lions football players
West Chester Golden Rams football coaches
People from Altoona, Pennsylvania
Players of American football from Pennsylvania